Raymond Franklin "Bobby" Coombs (February 2, 1908 – October 21, 1991) was a Major League Baseball pitcher.  The ,  right-hander played for the Philadelphia Athletics (1933) and New York Giants (1943).  His career was unusual in that he went almost ten years between major league appearances.

Coombs pitched at Phillips Exeter Academy and for the Duke Blue Devils baseball team where he was coached by his uncle, Jack Coombs.

A native of Goodwins Mills, Maine, Coombs made his major league debut in relief on June 8, 1933, in a home game against the New York Yankees at Shibe Park. His final game, almost ten years later at the age of 35, was in a doubleheader against the Pittsburgh Pirates at Forbes Field on June 6, 1943.

Coombs' career totals include 30 games pitched, all in relief, a 0–2 record with 17 games finished, 2 saves, 49 earned runs allowed in 47 innings, and an ERA of 9.32.

Coombs died at the age of 83 in Ogunquit, Maine.

Coombs coached at Williams College from 1946 to 1973, where there is now a Bobby Coombs Field.

References

External links

1908 births
1991 deaths
Major League Baseball pitchers
Baseball players from Maine
Philadelphia Athletics players
New York Giants (NL) players
Syracuse Chiefs players
Birmingham Barons players
St. Paul Saints (AA) players
Shreveport Sports players
Jersey City Giants players
Duke Blue Devils baseball players
People from Ogunquit, Maine
Baseball coaches from Maine
Phillips Exeter Academy alumni
Burials in Maine
Duke Blue Devils football players